Shayna Steele (born September 23, 1975) is an American singer, songwriter and a Broadway stage actress.

Career
Steele's Broadway credits include Rent at the Nederlander Theatre, the revival of Jesus Christ Superstar at the Foxwoods Theatre (formerly the Ford Center for the Performing Arts), and the original Broadway cast of Hairspray, in which she played a member of the girl group The Dynamites.  She went on to appear in Hairspray Live!, broadcast on December 7, 2016.

Steele sings background vocals for Bette Midler in "The Showgirl Must Go On" in Las Vegas. She has also performed on several albums, including Moby's Hotel, and Moby's single "Disco Lies", which reached No. 1 on Billboard's Hot Dance Club Play list. In 2004, Steele released her first self-titled EP and in 2009 released her first album, I'll Be Anything.
In 2011, Steele was hired to sing background vocals for Rihanna on her Australian tour of Last Girl on Earth. She toured again with Rihanna on her North American and European "LOUD" tour starting on June 4, 2014, in Baltimore, Maryland, as a background vocalist.

References

External links

 Official website
 BroadwayWorld.com

 Discography

American stage actresses
Biloxi High School alumni
1975 births
Living people
21st-century American women